Lanfair Valley is located in the Mojave Desert in southeastern California near the Nevada state line. It is bounded on the north by the New York Mountains and Castle Mountains, on the east by the Piute Range, and on the south by the Woods Mountains and Vontrigger Hills. Joshua Trees can be found in most of the valley.  Elevation is 4,045 feet.

The valley proper is drained southeastwards, then due south by the Sacramento Wash; the wash then turns due-east and combines with the Piute Wash drainage (south out of Nevada), to immediately enter the west bank of the Colorado River. The dual valley drainage is a U-shape, and the first major dry wash drainage from the west, into the Colorado, south of Lake Mead.

Mojave Road
The Old Mojave Road traverses the valley center, west to east. It passes eastwards just south of center at the Piute Range, and then through a central-southern stretch of the Piute Valley to its eastern terminus at north of AVI Casino across from FT. Mohave AZ, west bank of the Colorado River opposite [[Fort Mohave Mesa, Arizona|

Castle Mountains National Monument

The Castle Mountains National Monument is part of the north and northeast perimeter of Lanfair Valley, (its watershed). The Castle Mountains (California) proper is on the water divide between the headwaters of a south-flowing section of Lanfair Valley, and a northwesterly section of the south-flowing Piute Wash of Piute Valley (the similar south-trending valley and wash adjacent east).

The central part of the valley contains the Grotto Hills (also known as Giotto Hills) and Lanfair Buttes.

Lanfair, California
The valley is home to the Lanfair ghost town at the intersection of Cedar Canyon Road and Lanfair Road.  While once thriving, all that is now left of the town of Lanfair is rubble.  Both Lanfair Valley, and its ghost town, are named for Ernest L. Lanfair, a settlement owner.  Tens of thousand of acres in the valley are privately held, despite being located in the Mojave National Preserve. Few people live in the valley today, but at one time there were schools, farms, post offices, and even a railroad.

Geography

See also
Sacramento Wash (California)
Mojave National Preserve
Mojave Road
Piute Valley & Wash

References

 Casebier, Dennis G. Lanfair Valley - A Black Homesteading Experience -

External links

Ghost Towns (and Historic Towns) of Mojave National Preserve, (coord, Lanfair)

 
Mojave National Preserve
Valleys of California
Valleys of the Mojave Desert
Valleys of San Bernardino County, California